Baicoli are an Italian biscuit, originating in Venice.

Baicoli gain their name because their shape resemble that of sea bass, which in local dialect is called baicoli.

These biscuits were created as a ship's biscuit, for long sea voyages by Venetian ships. Being very dry, these biscuits maintain their consistency for a long duration, when properly stored in the distinctive yellow tin boxes in which they are traditionally sold. Their preparation, which is long and laborious, has two acts of leavening and double baking.

Today, Baicoli are served with coffee and zabaglione, in which they could be dipped.

References

Cuisine of Veneto
Italian pastries
Biscuits